Veleka Ridge is a predominantly ice-free ridge extending 3 km between Charity Glacier in the north and Botev Point in the south, and 1.3 km wide, in the southwest extremity of Friesland Ridge, Tangra Mountains on Livingston Island in the South Shetland Islands, Antarctica. Surmounting Tarnovo Ice Piedmont to the east, Charity Glacier to the north, Arkutino Beach to the west, and Barnard Point and Botev Point to the southwest and south respectively. The ridge's summit Veleka Peak rises to 538 m in its north extremity.

The ridge was named after the Veleka River in southeastern Bulgaria.

Location

Maps
 South Shetland Islands. Scale 1:200000 topographic map. DOS 610 Sheet W 62 60. Tolworth, UK, 1968.
 Islas Livingston y Decepción.  Mapa topográfico a escala 1:100000.  Madrid: Servicio Geográfico del Ejército, 1991.
 S. Soccol, D. Gildea and J. Bath. Livingston Island, Antarctica. Scale 1:100000 satellite map. The Omega Foundation, USA, 2004.
 L.L. Ivanov et al., Antarctica: Livingston Island and Greenwich Island, South Shetland Islands (from English Strait to Morton Strait, with illustrations and ice-cover distribution), 1:100000 scale topographic map, Antarctic Place-names Commission of Bulgaria, Sofia, 2005
 L.L. Ivanov. Antarctica: Livingston Island and Greenwich, Robert, Snow and Smith Islands. Scale 1:120000 topographic map. Troyan: Manfred Wörner Foundation, 2010.  (First edition 2009. )
 Antarctic Digital Database (ADD). Scale 1:250000 topographic map of Antarctica. Scientific Committee on Antarctic Research (SCAR), 1993–2016.

Notes

References
 Veleka Ridge. SCAR Composite Gazetteer of Antarctica
 Bulgarian Antarctic Gazetteer. Antarctic Place-names Commission. (details in Bulgarian, basic data in English)

External links
 Veleka Ridge. Copernix satellite image

Tangra Mountains
Ridges of Antarctica